The Italian Tenors consists of three Italian opera singers Mirko Provini, Sabino Gaita and Evans Tonon. The group is produced by former Warner and Polydor manager Götz Kiso in Germany. The Italian Tenors released their first album That's Amore (Label: Koch Universal Music) in May 2012. It was produced in November 2011 in Turin, Italy, by René Möckel. The album covers a variety of songs from celebrated Italian pop artists and composers, rearranged, and reinterpreted in Italian and English.

The group joined Chinese soprano and Grammy Award winner Jia Ruhan and recorded with her two duets to be included in her crossover album Smile, released in 2013.

The Italian Tenors are managed by Maxi Media, a German music and TV production company based in Cologne, Germany.

Members
Sabino Gaita was born on April 24, 1977, in Milan, Italy, where he studied music at the local conservatory. He is a tenor and a composer. He plays saxophone, clarinet and piano. Today he lives in Turin, Italy.
Mirko Provini was born on March 27, 1985, in Cremenaga, Italy. He studied music at Milan's conservatory besides holding a degree in sociology.
Evans Tonon was born on October 9, 1970, in Turin, Italy. He is a baritone and studied music in London and Rome. He has performed in several Italian opera houses.

Discography
That's Amore (2012)
Piccola e fragile
Senza una donna
Adesso tu
That's Amore
Miserere
Bella e impossibile
Here's to You
Se bastasse una canzone
Parla più piano (Love Theme from The Godfather)
Ti sento
Io non ti lascio più
Ti amo
Arrivederci Roma
The album reached #44 on the Austria Album Top 75 chart.

Viva La Vita (2014)
Gloria
Tornerò
C'era una volta la terra mia
Un' estate italiana
Mamma Maria
Felicità
Gente di mare
Somewhere
Hallelujah
Con te partirò
Io che non vivo senza te
Caruso

References

External links

"Koch Universal kochte mit den Italian Tenors", 22 May 2012, Mediabiz.de (in German) 
"The Italian Tenors", Acharts.co

Italian musical groups
Crossover (music)
Vocal trios
Tenor vocal groups